Imran Khan Mohmand (died June 18, 2013) was a Pakistani politician who was elected as a member of the Provincial Assembly of Khyber Pakhtunkhwa in 2013, from PK-27 (Mardan-V). He was previously a member of the Awami National Party. He contested as an independent candidate in the 2013 general election. He joined the Pakistan Tehreek-e-Insaf government upon being elected to the assembly.

Death
On June 18, 2013, he was killed during a bombing at a funeral in Mardan. The attack was possibly an assassination. He was the second member of the newly elected Khyber Pakhtunkhwa assembly to be killed, following the targeted assassination of Farid Khan weeks earlier.

References

2013 deaths
Awami National Party politicians
Pakistan Tehreek-e-Insaf politicians
Independent politicians in Pakistan
Pashtun people
People from Mardan District
Pakistani terrorism victims
Khyber Pakhtunkhwa MPAs 2013–2018
Year of birth missing
Assassinated Pakistani politicians